Sir Joseph Hector McNeil Carruthers  (21 December 185710 December 1932) was an Australian politician who served as Premier of New South Wales from 1904 to 1907.

Carruthers is perhaps best remembered for founding the Liberal and Reform Association, the forerunner to the modern Liberal Party of Australia (New South Wales Division). Zachary Gorman has argued that Carruthers played a central role in re-orientating Australian liberalism to sit on the centre-right of the political divide, influencing political developments at both the Federal and State level. According to Percival Serle, few premiers of New South Wales succeeded in doing so much distinguished work. Early in his career, Henry Parkes, recognized Carruthers' untiring energy and ability, acknowledged that if Carruthers' comparatively frail body had allowed him, he might have done even more remarkable work for his own state or for the Commonwealth.

Early years
Carruthers was born in Kiama, New South Wales to Charlotte  Prince and John Carruthers. He attended William Street National School and Fort Street High School in Sydney. After boarding at George Metcalfe's High School, Goulburn, he went up to the University of Sydney and graduated with a Bachelor of Arts in 1876. Two years later, he took his Master of Arts degree and was admitted to practice as a solicitor, where he remained for some years. In December 1879, he married Louise Marion Roberts.

Political career
In 1887, Carruthers obtained the most votes for the four-member Legislative Assembly seat of Canterbury, on a platform of local issues, free trade, social reform, land reform, industrial conciliation and arbitration, and an elective Legislative Council. He held Canterbury until 1894, when he switched to the new seat of St George. In March 1889, as Minister of Public Instruction, he joined Henry Parkes's last ministry, and soon showed himself to be an energetic administrator. He took a special interest in technical schools, particularly Ultimo Technical College, which later established a great reputation. Parkes resigned in October 1891, and Carruthers was instrumental in ensuring that Parkes was replaced as leader of the Free Trade Party by his close friend George Reid. After a successful election largely co-ordinated by Carruthers the Reid ministry was formed in August 1894. Carruthers was given the position of Secretary for Lands, and passed an important Crown Lands Act in 1895. The act of 1861 had not solved the perennial problems between the squatters and the selectors, but the new Act made an important change by dividing pastoral leases into two; one half of which was to be available for free selectors, while the pastoral lessee was able to obtain a long term for the other half. Another important aspect was that the right of the Crown tenants to the value of their improvements, was recognized. Carruthers made an able speech in introducing this measure and his reforms were widely supported.

In 1895, he divorced his wife and was granted custody of their children. In 1897, in the Truth, John Norton accused him of irregularities in his divorce, immorality in his private life, and land abuses as Secretary for Lands. Norton was prosecuted for criminal libel but the jury could not agree on a verdict. In July 1899, he took over the position of Treasurer but a few weeks later, Reid was defeated and resigned.

Federation

Carruthers was an ardent federalist, a cause he supported for both economic and patriotic reasons. He also saw federation as necessary for a White Australia Policy, though this was a policy he would develop misgivings about later in life. Carruthers was elected third on the list as one of the 10 New South Wales representatives at the 1897 Federal convention. At the Adelaide session held in March 1897, he was appointed a member of the constitutional committee, and when the draft constitution came to be considered by the various legislatures, he introduced the bill in the Legislative Assembly of New South Wales on 5 May 1898. It was a difficult task as there was considerable opposition in that chamber, and various amendments were suggested. At the September meeting of the convention held in Sydney, the longest debate took place over the question of deadlocks, and Carruthers proposed, carried by 28 votes to 13, a proposition that in certain circumstances, there should be a joint sitting of both Houses at which a three-fifths majority should carry the measure. This was altered in 1899, to an absolute majority of the total number of the members of both Houses. At the Melbourne session held early in 1898, he fought vigorously for the irrigation rights of New South Wales.

Premier

With the coming of Federation in 1901, Reid went to the Federal House and was replaced as leader by Charles Lee. Lee was not very successful and soon Carruthers replaced him as leader of the New South Wales opposition, creating the Liberal and Reform Association as the successor to the Free Trade Party. The LRA had an innovative structure, with mass membership, coordinated campaign strategies and a permanent executive. Carruthers had deliberately moved the party away from the tariff issue, which was now a Federal responsibility, and established a broad platform embodying the principles of Gladstonian classical liberalism. He positioned his support for enterprise and economic freedom against what he saw as the increasingly socialistic policies of the Progressive Minister for Public Works Edward William O'Sullivan and the Labor Party, arguing that politics required clear 'lines of cleavage' with a two-party system to give people a clear choice at elections. In doing so Carruthers placed his liberal party on the centre-right of the political divide, a move George Reid would copy with his Federal anti-socialist campaign.

Carruthers party won the July 1904 election on "an alliance of Liberalism, temperance and Protestantism". The middle Progressive Party was isolated by Carruthers 'lines of cleavage' rhetoric, leaving them with only 16 seats. Although Carruthers had a majority of only one in the House, many of the Progressives gave him tacit support and his ministry never seemed to be in real danger during its term of office. As Premier and Treasurer, Carruthers did admirable work and not only showed increasing surpluses each year, but at the same time, succeeded in reducing taxation and railway rates. His Local Government Act of 1906 introduced the enduring comprehensive system of local government, which exists to this day. This new tier of government was set up without a significant increase in taxation, as the existing land tax was transferred to become council rates. In 1907 Carruthers even promised to abolish the income tax, a policy his successor Charles Wade would partially follow through with, abolishing the tax for incomes under £1000.  Between 1904 and 1907, closer settlement schemes made nearly six million acres (24,000 km2) available for settlement. A beginning was also made on the Burrinjuck irrigation dam. In 1907, Carruthers succeeded in forcing a  "fusion" of much of the Progressive Party with the LRA, further cementing the liberals as the main opposition to the Labor Party in New South Wales.

Curruthers and the New South Wales Government that he led were strongly opposed to the selection of Dalgety, as the site of Australia's national capital, under the Seat of Government Act 1904. Their opposition to Dalgety and preference for a site in the 'Yass-Canberra' area was important in the later selection of Canberra.

He persuaded William Sandford to agree to William Sandford Limited contracting to supply all of the New South Wales Government's needs for iron and steel, for a seven year period, in 1905. Most of this steel would be in the form of heavy steel rails for railways. A condition of that contract was that local iron ore, coal and limestone were to be used to produce iron, necessitating the erection of a blast furnace and the opening of an iron ore mine. Curruthers officially opened the blast furnace at Lithgow, in May 1907, an event that began the modern iron and steel industry in Australia.

In 1905–06, a Royal Commission inquired into land scandals and investigated accusations made against Carruthers and the behaviour of his law firm. He testified before it eight times. The commissioner found that nothing in the evidence implicated Carruthers, but he gave up his law practice for a few years. These accusations were raised again in the 1907 election. To distract attention, even suggestion secession, he launched an attack on the Federal Government's recent increase in tariffs, particularly on wire-netting. He fought a strenuous election campaign, that while successful overtaxed his strength, and he was forced to retire temporarily from politics in September following the election. In October 1908, he entered the Legislative Council.

Though he did not hold office again for many years and controversially suggested during the First World War that New South Welshmen "ought to go down on (our) knees and pray (to) God to give us another Cromwell, who will send our Parliaments and our Politicians to the roundabout", he was a power behind the scenes in the politics of his day. Much interested in primary production, he had model farms of his own in the south west of New South Wales, and he was chairman of a select committee on agriculture in 1920–1. In April 1922 he joined the coalition ministry under Sir G. W. Fuller as vice-president of the executive council and leader of the upper House, and remained in office until June 1925. As part of that role, he steered the Sydney Harbour Bridge Bill through what was at times quite a hostile Legislative Council. He died on 10 December 1932. A state funeral was attended by many notable Sydney citizens at All Saints Church, Woollahra on 12 December 1932, and later at his burial at South Head Cemetery.  He was twice married and was survived by Lady Carruthers, three sons and four daughters.

Assessment

Though he never entered Federal politics, Carruthers was one of the most important politicians of his era. As Reid's effective deputy he rallied free traders to the Federation cause, successfully resisted Deakin's plan to establish the Federal capital at Dalgety, instituted NSW's system of local government, and in later years led the fight against the abolition of the Legislative Council. In this way, he directly influenced the composition of all three tiers of government. Carruthers was a successful Premier, laying a pattern of how liberal governments would operate. Most importantly, the LRA largely endures in the modern NSW Liberal Party.

Carruthers had many interests. In his younger days he played both cricket and football for his university, and in later years became a leading bowler. He was chairman of the New South Wales Cricket Association and the Board of Associated Race Clubs; a trustee of the art gallery, and a member of the university senate. For 21 years, he represented the district where the spot of Captain James Cook landing in Australia was located. Through his efforts, a large area there was set aside as a national park around the close of the century. In 1908, he wrote a letter to The Times which led to the erection of a statue of Captain Cook in London, and on his suggestion, the territorial government of Hawaii later dedicated to the public the land surrounding the bay where Cook was killed. He also came to the conclusion that Cook's name required vindicating in some areas, and in 1930, John Murray published for him his Captain James Cook, R.N. One Hundred and fifty years after. He was a friend of Frederick Earle Winchcombe, who was the founding President of the Wildlife Preservation Society of Australia. Carruthers followed Winchcombe as President of the Society in 1911, serving only one term of office.

Always a popular MP with his constituents, Carruthers has by later commentators been judged "a peppery little man" (John La Nauze) of "untiring energy" (Percival Serle).

Honours
Carruthers was created a Knight Commander of the Order of St Michael and St George (KCMG) in 1908.

References

 

Premiers of New South Wales
Members of the New South Wales Legislative Assembly
Australian Knights Commander of the Order of St Michael and St George
Australian politicians awarded knighthoods
1857 births
1932 deaths
Leaders of the Opposition in New South Wales
People educated at Fort Street High School
Treasurers of New South Wales
Members of the New South Wales Legislative Council